Cuando los hijos se van (English title: When the kids leave) is a Mexican telenovela produced by Silvia Pinal for Televisa in 1983.

Saby Kamalich and Raúl Ramírez starred as protagonists, while Roberto Ballesteros starred as main antagonist.

Plot 
Julio and Francisca have a strong marriage and five grown children, and there are problems: Teresa, when I was young and naive, fell in love with Álvaro, a married man, but 10 years later can not maintain the facade facing the family and confesses everything. However, although Álvaro is leaving, she can not; your love is true and completely mutual.

Kiko, another son, uses and abuses Susana's love, who loves him dearly. He turns his back to love, only to receive financial support from it, but then becomes the hunted hunter as falls in love with Susan. But Kiko has made too many mistakes in his life and thinks it would be unfair to tie Susana a man like him. Hilda has a perfect romance: love Jorge, a good young, professional and very correct, a white wedding and irreproachable life.

For Ignacio, love is a reckoning with himself. He gains confidence in himself, begins his terrible resolve their inferiority complex internal problems. Behind this is Claudia, a girl who loves him for the beauty of his spirit. Maria Graciela is in love for the first time, with Ricardo. She is all passionate kisses, languishing glances, sighs loudly and tantrums, but is it really love or infatuation?

Cast 

 Saby Kamalich as Francisca Mendoza
 Raúl Ramírez as Julio Mendoza
 Silvia Pasquel as Teresa Mendoza
 Enrique Rocha as Álvaro
 Alejandro Camacho as Ignacio Mendoza
 Anabel Ferreira as Hilda Mendoza
 Roberto Ballesteros as Julio Francisco "Kiko" Mendoza
 Rosenda Monteros as Aunt Elvira
 Margarita Sanz as Rebeca
 Mónica Prado as Susana
 Mercedes Olea as María Graciela Mendoza
 Jorge Pais as Damián
 Crystal as Claudia
 Claudio Báez as Jorge Guerra
 Demián Bichir as Ricardo
 Simone Brook as Martha
 Eloísa Capdevilla as Doña Matilde
 Deborah Conde as Dominga
 Alfonso Barclay as Alfonso
 Alejandra Guzmán as Alejandra
 Luis Enrique Guzmán as Chito
 Raúl Marcelo as Abel
 Carmen Rodríguez as Diana
 Lucero Lander as Lolita
 Uriel Chávez as Vicente
 Judith Velasco Herrera as Vicente's wife
 Sara Guasch

References

External links 
 

1983 telenovelas
Mexican telenovelas
1983 Mexican television series debuts
1983 Mexican television series endings
Spanish-language telenovelas
Television shows set in Mexico
Televisa telenovelas